is a road interchange located in Nagano City, Nagano Prefecture, Japan.

This is the interchange nearest to downtown Nagano City, which is the capital of Nagano Prefecture, and Matsushiro. It is on:
 National Route 403
 Prefectural Route 35 (長野県道35号長野真田線).
It also provides easy access to:
 National Route 18
 National Route 19

Expressway 

East Nippon Expressway Company
 Jōshin-etsu Expressway

Adjacent Interchanges 

|-
|colspan=5 style="text-align:center;" |East Expressway Company

Roads in Nagano Prefecture